Swindon College is a further education college in Swindon, England. Its campus is at North Star, just north of the town centre. The college offers HNC/Ds and Foundation Degrees, through to B.A. (Hons) courses and a postgraduate programme.

Steve Wain has been Principal of the college since 2016.

References

External links 

Education in Swindon
Further education colleges in Wiltshire
Higher education colleges in England